Bab Taza is a town in Chefchaouen Province, Tanger-Tetouan-Al Hoceima, Morocco. According to the 2004 census it has a population of 4,066. A nearby attraction is the Kef Toghobeit Cave which is one of the deepest caves in Africa.

References

Populated places in Chefchaouen Province
Rural communes of Tanger-Tetouan-Al Hoceima